Since the 2007 municipal reform, Ikast-Brande Municipality have only had mayors from Venstre. In 2017 the traditional blue bloc parties won 15 of the 23 seats, and Ib Lauritsen would took over from Carsten Kissmeyer who did not stand for re-election. 

The blue bloc would again win 15 seats in this election, however Venstre would lose 2 seats, while the Conservatives gained 2 seats. Danish People's Party would also lose a seat, while the The New Right, who stood for the first time in Ikast-Brande, would gain one. Eventually it was announced that Ib Lauritsen from Venstre would continue as mayor for a second term.

Electoral system
For elections to Danish municipalities, a number varying from 9 to 31 are chosen to be elected to the municipal council. The seats are then allocated using the D'Hondt method and a closed list proportional representation.
Ikast-Brande Municipality had 23 seats in 2021

Unlike in Danish General Elections, in elections to municipal councils, electoral alliances are allowed.

Electoral alliances  

Electoral Alliance 1

Electoral Alliance 2

Electoral Alliance 3

Results

Notes

References 

Ikast-Brande
Politics of Denmark